La Copa Junior VIP (2014) (Spanish for "The Junior Cup") was a professional wrestling tournament produced and scripted by the Mexican wrestling promotion Consejo Mundial de Lucha Libre (CMLLl; Spanish "World Wrestling Council"). The tournament ran from September 29, 2014, to September 10, 2014, in Arena México in Mexico City, Mexico. CMLL's recurring La Copa Junior tournament featured second, third, or fourth-generation wrestlers competing against each other. The 2014 La Copa Junior VIP was the seventh tournament held by CMLL and the only year that CMLL held two La Copa Junior tournaments.

Sixteen second-generation wrestlers participated in a single-elimination tournament, with the first, quarterfinal and semifinal matches being contested under single falls rules, while the final was a best two-out-of-three falls match. The tournament saw Máximo, son of Brazo de Plata, defeat Mephisto, son of Astro Rey, to win the 2014 La Copa Junior VIP.

Production

Background
Starting in 1996 the Mexican professional wrestling promotion Consejo Mundial de Lucha Libre ("World Wrestling Council"; CMLL) held their first ever La Copa Junior tournament. CMLL held the tournament to celebrate the fact that lucha libre in Mexico is often a family tradition, with a large number of second, third, or even fourth generation wrestlers following the footsteps of their relatives. The premise of the tournament is that all participants are second-generation or more, although at times the family relationship is a storylines family relationship and not an actual one. One example of this is Dragón Rojo Jr. being billed as the grandson of Dragón Rojo, when in reality that is simply a storyline created by CMLL. The original La Copa Junior was won by  Héctor Garza.

CMLL would not hold another La Copa Junior until the 2005 tournament (won by Shocker), followed by a 2006 tournament won by Dos Caras Jr. The tournament did not return until 2010 where Dragón Rojo Jr. won the 2010 version. In 2012 third-generation luchador La Sombra won the Junior cup

In 2014, CMLL held two La Copa Junior tournaments, first a tournament on January 1, won by Super Halcón Jr., followed by a VIP tournament, featuring higher card wrestlers than the usual tournaments, which was won by Máximo The semi-regular tournament returned in 2016, won by Esfinge In 2017, Soberano Jr. won the La Copa Junior Nuevos Valores

Storylines
The tournament featured a number of professional wrestling matches with different wrestlers involved in pre-existing scripted feuds, plots and storylines. Wrestlers were portrayed as either heels (referred to as rudos in Mexico, those that portray the "bad guys") or faces (técnicos in Mexico, the "good guy" characters) as they followed a series of tension-building events, which culminated in a wrestling match or series of matches.

Family relationship

Tournament
The La Copa Junior VIP tournament started on September 26, 2014 with half of the competitors facing off to determine the first finalist with Mephisto defeating Misterioso Jr., Shocker and finally Volador Jr. to earn a spot in the finals. Brazo de Plata was originally scheduled to take part in the tournament, but was replaced by Ángel de Oro without any official explanation. The second qualifying block took place on October 3 to determine the second finalist. In the second round Los Ingobernables teammates La Sombra and Rush faced off after both won their first round match. To the surprise of everyone, and contrary to statements made before the tournament, the two decided not to fight each other at all and Rush gave the win to La Sombra. La Sombra faced Máximo in the block finals after Máximo defeated Puma and Stuka Jr. on his way to the finals. In the finals La Sombra was disqualified for kicking Máximo in the groin, costing him the match and allowing Máximo to advance to the tournament finals. Euforia was the only competitor in the 2014 VIP tournament to have never competed in the La Copa Junior tournament before, despite it being openly acknowledge that he was the son of the original El Soberano, his son, the current Soberano, had not participated in a La Copa Junior tournament either at that point. On October 10 Máximo defeated Mephisto to win his first ever La Copa Junior tournament.

Brackets

Results

September 29

October 3

October 10

References

2014 in professional wrestling
2014 in Mexico
CMLL La Copa Junior
September 2014 events in Mexico